Brogan Yvonne Hay (born 1 March 1999) is a Scottish footballer who plays for Rangers in the Scottish Women's Premier League (SWPL) as a right winger or forward.

Club career
After attending coaching sessions with the charity diversionary initiative 'Moving The Goalposts' as a child, Hay began playing at youth level for Glasgow City at the age of 11. She made her first team debut against Rangers on 28 June 2015, when she was 15. In March 2016, she scored her first senior team goal in the Scottish Women's League Cup against Inverness City.

In October 2017, Hay left Glasgow City and moved to fellow SWPL club Rangers, reuniting with former City youth coach Amy McDonald, who had since become manager of the Gers side. Having recovered from a serious ankle injury to be voted the league's Player of the Month for August/September 2019, she agreed an 18-month professional contract extension with Rangers in December 2019. She was named SWPL Player of the Month for a second time in April 2021, and agreed a further contract extension in April 2022.

International career
Hay has represented Scotland at the under-15 and under-17 levels. In September 2015 she scored two goals, within three minutes, against the Republic of Ireland at Ainslie Park; Scotland won the game 3–0.

In 2017 she was part of the Scotland under-19 squad which qualified for the 2017 UEFA Women's Under-19 Championship, and made one appearance at the finals tournament as a late substitute in a 1–0 loss to Spain.

Hay was called up to the senior squad for the first time in November 2022.

Personal life
Hay was raised in the Fernhill neighbourhood of Rutherglen, and attended Trinity High School in the town.

Her older sister Kodie is also a footballer and a forward who began her career at Glasgow City; both siblings left the club at the same time for more playing opportunities, with Kodie moving to Hamilton Academical and later to Celtic and Motherwell. During the 2019 season, they played against one another in the Old Firm derby.

Their uncle is former professional footballer Stephen McKeown.

Honours

Club
Glasgow City
 Scottish Women's Premier League: 2015, 2016
 Scottish Women's Cup: 2015

Rangers
 Scottish Women's Premier League: 2021–22
 Scottish Women's Premier League Cup: 2022
 City of Glasgow Woman's Cup: 2022

References

External links 
 
 
 

1999 births
Living people
Sportspeople from Rutherglen
People educated at Trinity High School, Rutherglen
Glasgow City F.C. players
Rangers W.F.C. players
Scottish women's footballers
Scottish Women's Premier League players
Women's association football forwards
Women's association football wingers
Footballers from South Lanarkshire
Scotland women's international footballers